Gitano is a 2007 album of zarzuela arias sung by tenor Rolando Villazón, with the Orquesta de la Comunidad de Madrid conducted by Plácido Domingo, for Virgin Classics.

Track listing
 "Por el humo se sabe dónde está el fuego" from Doña Francisquita by Amadeu Vives, libretto Federico Romero, Guillermo Fernández Shaw 
 "Bella enamorada" from El último romántico (1928) Reveriano Soutullo, Juan Vert, libretto José Tellaeche
 "Raquel" from El huésped del Sevillano (1926) Jacinto Guerrero lyrics Enrique Reoyo, Juan Ignacio Luca de Tena
 "De este apacible rincón de Madrid" from Luisa Fernanda (1932) Federico Moreno Torroba, lyrics Federico Romero, Guillermo Fernández Shaw
 "Pajarin, tú que vuelas" from La pícara molinera (1928) Pablo Luna, lyrics Pilar Monterde, Eulalia Fernández Galván, Ángel Torres del Álamo, Antonio Asenjo Pérez
 "Canción guajira" from La alegría del batallón (1909) José Serrano Carlos Arniches, Félix Quintana
 "La roca fría del Calvario" from La dolorosa (1930) José Serrano Juan José Lorente
 "Madrileña bonita" from La del manojo de rosas (1934) Pablo Sorozábal Anselmo Cuadrado Carreño, Francisco Ramos de Castro
 "No puede ser" from La tabernera del puerto (1936) Pablo Sorozábal Federico Romero, Guillermo Fernández Shaw
 "Ya mis horas felices" from La del soto del Parral (1927) Reveriano Soutullo, Juan Vert Luis Fernández de Sevilla, Anselmo Cuadrado Carreño
 "Suena guitarrico mío" - Jota de Perico from El guitarrico (1900) Agustín Pérez Soriano Manuel Fernández de la Puente, Luis Pascual Frutos
 "Mi aldea" from Los gavilanes (1923) Jacinto Guerrero José Ramos Martín
 Jota - "Te quiero, morena" from El trust de los tenorios (1910) José Serrano Carlos Arniches, Enrique García Álvarez
 "Amor, vida de mi vida" from Maravilla (1941) Federico Moreno Torroba Antonio Quintero, Jesús María Arozamena
 "Un gitano sin su honor" from Luna (1998) José María Cano music and lyrics

Chart positions

References

Zarzuela
2007 classical albums
Plácido Domingo albums
Rolando Villazón albums